This is a comprehensive list of major music awards received by R.E.M., an American rock band from Athens, Georgia, formed in 1980 by drummer Bill Berry, guitarist Peter Buck, bassist Mike Mills, and lead vocalist Michael Stipe who were students at the University of Georgia. One of the first alternative rock bands, R.E.M. was noted for Buck's ringing, arpeggiated guitar style; Stipe's distinctive vocal quality, unique stage presence, and obscure lyrics; Mills's melodic basslines and backing vocals; and Berry's tight, economical drumming style. In the early 1990s, other alternative rock acts such as Nirvana and Pavement viewed R.E.M. as a pioneer of the genre. After drummer Bill Berry left the band in 1997, the band continued its career in the 2000s with mixed critical and commercial success. The band broke up amicably in 2011 with members devoting time to solo projects after having sold more than 90 million albums worldwide and becoming one of the world's best-selling music artists.

American Music Awards

|-
| style="text-align:left;"|1992
| Out of Time
| Favorite Pop/Rock Album
|

BMI Pop Awards

!Ref.
|-
| rowspan=3|1996
| "Bang and Blame"
| rowspan=2|Award-Winning Songs
| 
| rowspan=3|
|-
| rowspan=2|"What's the Frequency, Kenneth?"
| 
|-
| College Song of the Year
| 
|-
| 2001
| "The Great Beyond"
| Award-Winning Song
| 
|

Billboard Music Awards

|-
| style="text-align:left;" rowspan="2"|1991
| Out of Time
| Top Billboard 200 Album
|
|-
| R.E.M.
| Top Modern Rock Artist
|

Brit Awards

|-
| style="text-align:left;"|1992
| rowspan="6"| R.E.M.
| rowspan="6"| International Group
|
|-
| style="text-align:left;"|1993
|
|-
| style="text-align:left;"|1995
|
|-
| style="text-align:left;"|1997
|
|-
| style="text-align:left;"|1999
|
|-
| style="text-align:left;"|2002
|

CMJ New Music Awards

|-
|1984
| Reckoning
| rowspan=2|Album of the Year
| 
|-
| rowspan=2|1985
| Fables of the Reconstruction
| 
|-
| R.E.M.
| Group of the Year
|

Danish GAFFA Awards

!Ref.
|-
| rowspan=4|1992
| R.E.M.
| Band of the Year
| 
| rowspan=23|
|-
| Out of Time
| Album of the Year
| 
|-
| rowspan=2|"Losing My Religion"
| Song of the Year
| 
|-
| rowspan=2|Music Video of the Year
| 
|-
| rowspan=4|1993
| rowspan=2|"Drive"
| 
|-
| Song of the Year
| 
|-
| Automatic for the People
| Album of the Year
| 
|-
| R.E.M.
| Band of the Year
| 
|-
| 1995
| Monster
| rowspan=2|Best Foreign Album
| 
|-
| rowspan=3|1996
| New Adventures in Hi-Fi
| 
|-
| rowspan=3|R.E.M.
| Best Foreign Live Band
| 
|-
| rowspan=2|Best Foreign Band
| 
|-
| rowspan=3|1999
| 
|-
| Up
| Best Foreign Album
| 
|-
| Michael Stipe
| Best Foreign Songwriter
| 
|-
| rowspan=2|2000
| rowspan=3|R.E.M.
| Best Foreign Live Act
| 
|-
| Best Foreign 90's Act
| 
|-
| rowspan=3|2002
| Best Foreign Band
| 
|-
| Reveal
| Best Foreign Album
| 
|-
| rowspan=2|Michael Stipe
| rowspan=2|Best Foreign Songwriter
| 
|-
| rowspan=3|2005
| 
|-
| R.E.M.
| Best Foreign Album
| 
|-
| Around the Sun
| Best Foreign Album
|

Danish Music Awards

!Ref.
|-
| style="text-align:left;" rowspan=3|1999
| Michael Stipe
| Best Foreign Male Artist 
| 
| rowspan=3|
|-
| "Daysleeper"
| Best Foreign Hit 
| 
|-
| Up
| rowspan=2|Best Foreign Album
| 
|-
| style="text-align:left;"|2002
| Reveal
|
|

ECHO Awards

|-
| 1992
| rowspan="4" | R.E.M.
| rowspan="4" | Best International Group
| 
|-
| 2002
| 
|-
| 2005
| 
|-
| 2009
|

Grammy Awards

|-
|rowspan="7"| 1991
| rowspan="4"| "Losing My Religion"
| Record of the Year
|
|-
| Song of the Year
|
|-
| Best Pop Performance by a Duo or Group with Vocals
|
|-
| Best Music Video, Short Form
|
|-
| "Radio Song"
| Best Rock Performance by a Duo or Group with Vocal
|
|-
| rowspan="2"| Out of Time
| Best Alternative Music Album
|
|-
| Album of the Year
|
|-
| rowspan="4"|1994
| "Man on the Moon"
| Best Pop Performance by a Duo or Group with Vocals
|
|-
| "Everybody Hurts"
|  Best Music Video, Short Form
|
|-
| rowspan="2"| Automatic for the People
| Best Alternative Music Album
|
|-
| Album of the Year
|
|-
| style="text-align:left;"|1995
| Monster
|  Best Rock Album
|
|-
| style="text-align:left;"|1997
| New Adventures in Hi-Fi
|  Best Alternative Music Album
|
|-
| style="text-align:left;"|2001
| "The Great Beyond"
|  Best Song Written for a Motion Picture, Television or Other Visual Media
|
|-
| style="text-align:left;"|2002
| "Imitation of Life"
|  Best Pop Performance by a Duo or Group with Vocals
|

MTV Europe Music Awards

|-
| style="text-align:left;"|1995
| rowspan="2"| R.E.M.
| Best Live Act
|
|-
| style="text-align:left;"|2001
| Best Group
|

MTV Video Music Awards

|-
| style="text-align:left;"|1988
| "The One I Love"
| Best Direction
|
|-
| 1989
| "Orange Crush"
| Best Post-Modern Video
|
|-
|rowspan="10"| 1991
| rowspan="9"| "Losing My Religion"
| Video of the Year
|
|-
| Best Group Video
|
|-
| Breakthrough Video
|
|-
| Best Direction
|
|-
| Best Art Direction
|
|-
| Best Editing
|
|-
| Best Alternative Video
|
|-
| Best Cinematography
|
|-
| Viewer's Choice
|
|-
| Tourfilm
| Best Long Form Video
|
|-
| rowspan="6"|1993
| rowspan="6"| "Man on the Moon"
| Video of the Year
|
|-
| Best Group Video
|
|-
| Best Direction
|
|-
| Best Art Direction
|
|-
| Best Editing
|
|-
| Viewer's Choice
|
|-
| rowspan="7"|1994
| rowspan="7"|"Everybody Hurts"
| Video of the Year
|
|-
| Best Group Video
|
|-
| Viewer's Choice
|
|-
| Breakthrough Video
|
|-
| Best Direction
|
|-
| Best Editing
|
|-
| Best Cinematography
|
|-
| rowspan="2"|1995
| R.E.M.
| Michael Jackson Video Vanguard Award
|
|-
| "What's the Frequency, Kenneth?"
| Viewer's Choice
|
|-
| 1996
| "Tongue"
| Best Art Direction
|
|-
| rowspan="2"|2000
| rowspan="2"|"The Great Beyond"
| Best Video from a Film
|
|-
| Best Editing
|
|-
| rowspan="2"|2001
| rowspan="2"|"Imitation of Life"
| Breakthrough Video
|
|-
| Best Direction
|

Meteor Music Awards

|-
| style="text-align:left;"|2005
| R.E.M.
| Best International Group
|

NME Awards

|-
| style="text-align:left;"|1988
| Green
| Best LP
|
|-
| style="text-align:left;"|1991
| rowspan="2"| R.E.M.
| rowspan="2"| Best Band
|
|-
| style="text-align:left;" rowspan="2"|1992
|
|-
| Automatic for the People
| Best Album
|
|-
| 1996
| R.E.M.
| Best Band
| 
|-
| 2017
| Out of Time
| Best Reissue
|

Online Film & Television Association

|-
| 1999
| "Man on the Moon"
| Best Adapted Song 
|

Pollstar Concert Industry Awards

|-
| rowspan="2" | 1988
| Work Tour
| Small Hall Tour of the Year
| 
|-
| Themselves
| Next Major Arena Headliner
| 
|-
| rowspan="2" | 1996
| rowspan="2" | Monster Tour
| Major Tour of the Year
| 
|-
| rowspan="2" | Most Creative Stage Production
| 
|-
| 2000
| Up Tour
| 

Premios Ondas

!Ref.
|-
| rowspan=2|1992
| R.E.M.
| Best International Group
| 
| rowspan=2|
|-
| "Drive"
| Best International Song
|

Q Awards

|-
| style="text-align:left;" rowspan="2"|1991
| Out of Time
| Best Album
|
|-
| R.E.M.
| Best Act in the World Today
|
|-
| style="text-align:left;"|1992
| Automatic for the People
| Best Album
|
|-
| style="text-align:left;"|1994
| rowspan="6"| R.E.M.
| rowspan="2"| Best Act in the World Today
|
|-
| style="text-align:left;"|1995
|
|-
| style="text-align:left;"|1998
| Q Lifetime Achievement Award
|
|-
| style="text-align:left;"|1999
| rowspan="2"| Best Act in the World Today
|
|-
| style="text-align:left;"|2001
|
|-
| style="text-align:left;"|2011
| Qs Greatest Act of the Last 25 Years
|

Rockbjornen

|-
| style="text-align:left;" rowspan="3"|1994
| rowspan="2"| R.E.M.
| Best Foreign Artist
|
|-
| Best Foreign Group
|
|-
| Monster
| Best Foreign Album
|

World Music Awards

|-
| 2008
| R.E.M.
| World's Best Rock Artist
|

Žebřík Music Awards

!Ref.
|-
| 1995
| R.E.M.
| Best International Enjoyment
| 
| rowspan=2|
|-
| 1996
| New Adventures in Hi-Fi
| Best International Album
| 
|-
| rowspan=5|1998
| rowspan=2|Themselves
| rowspan=1|Best International Group
| 
| rowspan=12|
|-
| Best International Surprise
| 
|-
| rowspan=2|Michael Stipe
| Best International Male
| 
|-
| Best International Personality
| 
|-
| "Daysleeper"
| Best International Song
| 
|-
| rowspan=2|1999
| Michael Stipe
| Best International Personality
| 
|-
| rowspan=2|Themselves
| rowspan=2|Best International Group
| 
|-
| rowspan=2|2001
| 
|-
| Reveal
| Best International Album
| 
|-
| rowspan=3|2003
| rowspan=2|"Bad Day"
| Best International Song
| 
|-
| Best International Video
| 
|-
| rowspan=2|Themselves
| rowspan=2|Best International Group
| 
|-
| rowspan=3|2004
| 
| rowspan=4|
|-
| Michael Stipe
| Best International Personality
| 
|-
| Around the Sun
| rowspan=2|Best International Album
| 
|-
| 2008
| Accelerate
| 
|-
| 2011
| Disintegration of REM
| Best International Průser
| 
|

References

 Gray, Marcus. It Crawled from the South: An R.E.M. Companion. Da Capo, 1997. Second edition. 

Award
Lists of awards received by American musician
Lists of awards received by musical group